Sobol is a surname derived from the Slavic word sobol ("sable"), which may also have been a nickname for a fur trader. As a Yiddish surname, it may be a variant of Sobel, which also derives from sobol. It may refer to:

People
Anna Sobol-Wejman (born 1946), Polish printmaker
Artyom Sobol (born 1996), Russian footballer
Donald J. Sobol (1924–2012), American children's writer
Eduard Sobol (born 1995), Ukrainian footballer
Hubert Sobol (born 2000), Polish footballer
Ilya M. Sobol (born 1926), Soviet mathematician
Jacob Aue Sobol (born 1975), Danish photographer
Jan Sobol (born 1984), Czech handball player
Jan Sobol (footballer) (born 1953), Polish footballer
Jonathan Sobol, Canadian film director and writer
Kristina Sobol (born 1991), Russian weightlifter
Louis Sobol (1896–1986), American journalist
Lyubov Sobol (born 1987), Russian lawyer and politician
Paul Sobol (1926–2020), Belgian Holocaust survivor
Richard B. Sobol (1937–2020), American lawyer
Spiridon Sobol (died 1645), Belarusian printer and educator
Yehoshua Sobol (born 1939), Israeli playwright and director
Yuri Sobol (born 1966), Russian footballer
Soból, nom de guerre of Jan Stanisław Jankowski (1882–1953), Polish politician and member of civil resistance in WWII

See also
 
 Sobal
 Sobel (disambiguation)
 Sobole (disambiguation)
 Sobolev
 Sobolew (disambiguation)
 Sobolewski
 Sobolevskiy

References 

Slavic-language surnames